Amtali is a municipality in Barguna District in the division of Barisal, Bangladesh. It is the administrative headquarters and urban centre of Amtali Upazila. The municipality was established in 1998.

Points of interest 

 Bangabandhu Sculpture (বঙ্গবন্ধু ভাস্কর্য)
 Amtali Municipal Office (আমতলী পৌর ভবন)
 Payra River (পায়রা নদী)
 Abdullah Super Market (আবদুল্লাহ সুপার মার্কেট)
 Amtali Government College (আমতলী সরকারী কলেজ)

References 

Populated places in Barguna District
Towns in Bangladesh